Karel Přibyl (18 September 1899 – 1968) was a Czech sprinter. He competed in the 400 metres and the 800 metres at the 1920 Summer Olympics and the 1924 Summer Olympics.

References

External links
 

1899 births
1968 deaths
Athletes (track and field) at the 1920 Summer Olympics
Athletes (track and field) at the 1924 Summer Olympics
Czech male sprinters
Czech male middle-distance runners
Olympic athletes of Czechoslovakia
Place of birth missing